The Milken Institute School of Public Health (known as School of Public Health, Milken School, or SPH) is the school of public health of the George Washington University, in Washington, DC. U.S. News & World Report University Rankings ranks the Milken SPH as the 11th best public health graduate program in the United States.

With 1,000 graduate students and 180 undergraduate students from nearly every U.S. state and more than 35 nations pursue undergraduate, graduate, and doctoral-level degrees in public health, its student body is one of the most ethnically diverse among the nation's private schools of public health.

History
The GW School of Public Health and Health Services was established in July 1997, with Dr. Richard K. Riegelman as the Founding Dean,  bringing together three longstanding university programs in the schools of medicine, business, and education that have since expanded substantially.

On March 11, 2014, the Milken Institute, Sumner Redstone Charitable Foundation and the Milken Family Foundation donated a combined total of $80 million in three gifts to the renamed Milken Institute School of Public Health (Milken Institute SPH). The gifts also established the Sumner M. Redstone Global Center for Prevention and Wellness.

Facilities 

Milken's facilities are located in the George Washington University  campus area in Foggy Bottom. The main building is located at 950 New Hampshire Ave. NW, with administrative and research offices, the Himmelfarb Health Sciences Library and other laboratories also located within the area.

SPH's current facilities are:

 Main building (950 New Hampshire Ave.) 
 Science and Engineering Hall 
 Additional research offices and administrative staff (2175 K Street) 
 Library and Medical School Classrooms / Labs  at Ross Hall (2300 I Street)
 Public Health Research Clinic (2013 H Street) 
 VTSC Exercise Science Lab

Organization and administration 
Since 2010, SPH is led by Michael and Lori Milken Dean, Lynn R. Goldman.

Academics
The public health programs of the Milken Institute SPH have full accreditation from the Council on Education for Public Health. The program in health services administration is fully accredited by the Commission on Accreditation of Healthcare Management Education. The Athletic Training Education Program is fully accredited by the Commission on Accreditation of Athletic Training Education. The Milken Institute SPH is a member of the Association of Schools of Public Health.

The School offers six different bachelor's degrees, with three minors, 23 Master's degrees and also offers an array of joint degree programs, allowing students to couple a law degree with the Master of Public Health (MPH), or to combine an MPH with a medical degree or an MA in International Affairs. An MPH/Physician Assistant program, the first in the world, is available at the Milken Institute SPH, as is the opportunity to serve as a Peace Corps volunteer while pursuing an MPH. Milken also offers 8 doctoral degrees and different additional certificates. Milken also offers different online master's degrees and certificates.

At Milken each student is assigned an academic advisor, a faculty and / or staff member, who will help develop the individual study plan and guide the student though his time at SPH.

Milken offers practicum projects to students, cooperating with different organizations like the Centers for Disease Control and Prevention (CDC), USAID, The World Bank and others.

Departments

The School has seven academic departments:

 Biostatistics and Bioinformatics
 Environmental and Occupational Health
 Epidemiology
 Exercise and Nutrition Sciences
 Global Health
 Health Policy and Management
Prevention and Community Health

Within the departments, sixteen specialist centers, institutes, and special programs are sites for state-of-the-art research and training across the many disciplines of public health.

Online programs 
GW Public Health Online programs combine coursework and virtual classes. Coursework in Milken's online graduate programs covers areas such as bio-statistics, epidemiology, cultural competency, and more.

Online Master of Public Health Program 
The Milken Institute School of Public Health and the MPH@GW program are accredited by the Council on Education for Public Health (CEPH). The online MPH degree program prepares public health professionals to make a difference in local, national and global communities. Students can concentrate their electives in the following areas: Epidemiology and Public Health Research Methods, Environmental and Occupational Health, Health Communication, Health Policy, Program Planning and Evaluation, and Global Health. Students can complete the program on a part-time or full-time schedule.

One-Year Master of Public Health Program 
Milken's one-year MPH program requires students to complete 11.5 credits each quarter. The curriculum is the same as the standard MPH program. Students accepted to this track must be approved by the Program Director and are not permitted to work while enrolled.

Rankings 
U.S. News & World Report University Rankings ranks the SPH as the 11th best public health graduate program in the United States

Research 
The school's current research portfolio is approximately $18 million.

Milken is home to more than 20 Organized Research Units (ORUs), that are established by the GW Office of Vice President for Research and the Milken Institute SPH Policy for Establishing Organized Research Units.

Two months prior to the COVID-19 pandemic, The Milken Institute held a meeting titled "Universal Flu Vaccine" (dated October 29, 2019), hosted by Michael Specter of New York Magazine, and a number of government officials including Anthony Fauci, Rick Bright, Bruce Gellin, Margaret Hamburg, and a representative of Flu Lab, Casey Wright. Within the meeting, members spoke about the need to "blow up the system" in-order to bypass regulatory control on mRNA vaccines. Also discussed in the meeting was the need to create an "aura of excitement" and "make influenza sexy" in order to revive government funding and have hyper-production of the mRNA vaccines which the members of the meeting believed were superior to "traditional egg-based vaccines".

References

External links

 

 
Colleges and Schools of The George Washington University
Schools of public health in the United States
Educational institutions established in 1997
1997 establishments in Washington, D.C.
Medical and health organizations based in Washington, D.C.